Frankenweenie is a 1984 American science fiction comedy horror featurette directed by Tim Burton and written by him and Leonard Ripps. It is both a parody and homage to the 1931 film Frankenstein based on Mary Shelley's 1818 novel Frankenstein; or, The Modern Prometheus. Burton later directed a feature-length stop-motion animated remake, released in 2012.

Plot 
Victor Frankenstein is a young scientist who creates movies starring his dog, Sparky (a Bull Terrier, whose name is a reference to the use of electricity in the film). After Sparky is hit by a car and killed, Victor learns at school about electrical impulses in muscles and is inspired to bring his pet back to life. He creates elaborate machines which bring down a bolt of lightning that revives the dog. Victor is pleased, but when the Frankensteins decide to introduce the revitalized Sparky to his neighbors, they become angry and terrified.

Sparky runs away, with Victor in pursuit. They find themselves at a local miniature golf course and hide in its flagship windmill. The Frankensteins' neighbors, now an angry mob, arrive on the scene, and when they attempt to use a cigarette lighter to try to see in the windmill, it is accidentally set on fire. Victor falls and is knocked out, but Sparky rescues him from the flames, only to be crushed by the windmill. The mob of neighbors, realizing their error, use their cars and jumper cables to "recharge" Sparky. He is revived, and all celebrate. Sparky falls in love with a poodle whose fur bears a strong resemblance to the hairdo of the Bride of Frankenstein and the film ends with Sparky's electricity making the words, "The End" and it becomes still.

Cast 
 Barret Oliver as Victor Frankenstein, a young boy expert in science who is sad after his dog's death.
 Shelley Duvall as Susan Frankenstein, Victor's mother.
 Daniel Stern as Ben Frankenstein, Victor's father.
 Joseph Maher as Mr. Chambers
 Roz Braverman as Mrs. Epstein
 Paul Bartel as Mr. Walsh
 Sofia Coppola as Anne Chambers
 Jason Hervey as Frank Dale
 Paul C. Scott as Mike Anderson
 Helen Boll as Mrs. Curtis
 Rusty James as Raymond
 Sparky as Himself: Victor's dog. He dies and gets reanimated by Victor.

Home media 
This short was included in the Special Edition, Collector's Edition, and Blu-ray 3D releases of The Nightmare Before Christmas and on the Blu-ray release of its remake.

Controversy 
Burton was fired by Disney after the film was completed, as the studio claimed that he had been wasting company resources and felt the film was not suitable for the targeted young audiences. The short was originally planned to be released alongside the summer re-release of The Jungle Book, but its release was rescheduled with the Christmas re-release of Pinocchio on December 21, 1984. Although the film was subsequently shelved, the film played in UK cinemas in 1985 in front of Touchstone Films' Baby: Secret of the Lost Legend. Following the success of Burton's later films Pee-wee's Big Adventure, Beetlejuice, Batman, and Edward Scissorhands, the film was given a home video release in 1992. It was released as an extra, along with Vincent, on The Nightmare Before Christmas DVD, Blu-ray and UMDl.

Remake 

Disney and Tim Burton produced a full-length remake using stop motion animation, which was released on October 5, 2012 in Disney Digital 3D and IMAX 3D. The original film is included as a bonus feature on the Blu-ray home video release.

Notes

External links 
 
 
 

1984 films
1984 horror films
1984 fantasy films
1984 short films
American black-and-white films
American fantasy films
Films about dogs
Films about pets
Frankenstein films
American horror short films
Resurrection in film
Walt Disney Pictures films
Short films directed by Tim Burton
Disney short films
Films scored by Michael Convertino
Films scored by David Newman
Films set in the 1960s
Films shot in Los Angeles
1980s English-language films
1980s American films